Nikola Korač (born January 15, 1986) is a Montenegrin professional basketball player who last played for Podgorica of the Montenegrin Basketball League.

References

External links

1986 births
Living people
ABA League players
KK Igokea players
KK Lovćen players
KK Mornar Bar players
KK Podgorica players
KK Prokuplje players
KK Sutjeska players
OKK Beograd players
OKK Novi Pazar players
Montenegrin expatriate basketball people in Serbia
Montenegrin men's basketball players
People from Bijelo Polje
Point guards
GKK Šibenik players